"Maybe My Baby" is a song written by Eric Carmen, included on his 1984 LP, Eric Carmen.  The song was later recorded by American country music artist Louise Mandrell.  It was released in March 1985 as the first single and title track from the album Maybe My Baby.  The song reached number 8 on the Billboard Hot Country Singles & Tracks chart.

Chart performance

References

1985 singles
1984 songs
Eric Carmen songs
Louise Mandrell songs
Songs written by Eric Carmen
RCA Records singles